Lasino (Lasin in local dialect) was a comune (municipality) in Trentino in the northern Italian region Trentino-Alto Adige/Südtirol, located about  southwest of Trento. It was merged with Calavino to form a new municipality, Madruzzo.

Lasino borders the following municipalities: Trento, Calavino, Dro and Cavedine.

Demographic evolution

References

External links
 Homepage of the city

Cities and towns in Trentino-Alto Adige/Südtirol